Moville is a coastal town located on the Inishowen Peninsula of County Donegal, Ireland, close to the northern tip of the island of Ireland. It is the first coastal town of the Wild Atlantic Way when starting on the northern end.

Location
Features include Moville Green, a pier, a large seaside park in the Victorian style which features bandstands, walking trails, playgrounds, a coastal footpath and views east across the waters of the lough to Northern Ireland. Moville is close to several beaches, and receives visitors and daytrippers in the summer months.

Moville Community College is located to the south of the town centre, in the townland of Carrownaff.

History
In the second half of the 19th century, Moville was a point of embarkation for travellers, especially emigrants, to Canada and the United States of America. In the late 19th century, steamships of the Glasgow-based Anchor Line and Allan Line made port at Moville while en route to and from New York, while just after the turn of the 20th century, the Canadian Pacific Line also established a terminal at the port as part of their service connecting Liverpool and Montreal for Canadian-bound Irish immigrants. Today, the town receives little maritime traffic but retains a small fishing harbour. The commercial fishing port at Greencastle lies a few miles away.

The ancestors of Field-Marshal Bernard Montgomery, the Montgomerys of New Park, were a landed family of the town. When flying over the town in 1947 he commented: "It looks just the same. My dear old Irish home". His grandfather Robert Montgomery had built Montgomery Terrace in 1884.

Festivals
An annual regatta is held at Moville every year in August, and has done so since early in the 19th century.

Several music festivals take place in the area annually, including a festival of Bob Dylan music (DylanFest) which has taken place since 2007, and a festival of Beatles' music (BeatlesFest) which takes place in the town square in August.

Notable people
 Robert Montgomery (1809-1887) - British colonial administrator; Lieutenant Governor of Punjab
 Sheila McClean (1932-2016) - painter
 Art Parkinson (born 2001) - actor

Gallery

References

Towns and villages in County Donegal
Populated coastal places in the Republic of Ireland